{{Infobox book
| name           = Capitalism, Alone: The Future of the System That Rules the World
| orig title     =
| translator     =
| image          = File:Capitalism, Alone.jpg
| caption        = First edition
| author         = Branko Milanovic
| cover_artist   =
| location       = Cambridge, MA
| country        = 
| language       = English
| series         =
| classification = 
| genre          = Non-fiction
| publisher      = Belknap Press
| release_date   = May 24, 2019
| media_type     = 
| pages          =  
| isbn           =9780674987593
| isbn_note      =
| dewey=
| congress= 
| oclc= 
| preceded_by    =Global inequality: A New Approach for the Age of Globalization (2016)
| followed_by    =
}}Capitalism, Alone: The Future of the System That Rules the World is a 2019 nonfiction book published by Harvard University Press by Branko Milanovic, an economist at the Stone Centre on Socioeconomic Inequality at the City University of New York.

Themes
According to The Economist, in Capitalism, Alone Milanovic "argues that this unification of humankind under a single social system lends support to the view of history as a march towards progress."

Reviews
The review in The New Yorker said that Milanovic is a "whiz at number crunching" and "has a whimsical, wide-ranging appreciation for history and culture." Milanovic had "demonstrated how the benefits of globalization had been distributed among different classes across various groups of countries" by "using a giant World Bank database of household incomes in the 1990s. In Capitalism, Alone, he has "richly detailed" the consequences of inequality.

Roberto Iacono said the book was "remarkable" and "possibly the author's most comprehensive opus so far."The Wall Street Journal'' said that the book was a "stunted recitation of the political and economic crises afflicting Western capitalism, an unpersuasive account of China's economic model as a potential alternative and an implausibly dystopian vision of global capitalism’s future."

An article published as an International Monetary Fund (IMF) book reviews, said that the "valuable, data-rich, and thoughtful" book was an "ambitious and provocative examination of the present and the future of capitalism."

References

2019 non-fiction books
Economics books
Belknap Press books
Books about capitalism